Set Free is the EP by Patti Smith Group, released in 1978 on Arista Records.

Track listing

Side one 
 "Privilege (Set Me Free)" (Mel London, Mike Leander, Psalm 23) – 3:27
 "Ask the Angels" (Smith, Ivan Kral) – 3:07

Side two 
 "25th Floor" (Live in Paris, Easter Sunday 1978) (Smith, Kral) – 5:15
 "Babel Field" (Live in London, 28 February 1978 - Brian Jones' birthday) (Smith) – 5:45

Personnel 
 Patti Smith – vocals, guitar

Release history

Notes

External links 
 

Patti Smith albums
1978 EPs
Albums produced by Jimmy Iovine
Albums produced by Jack Douglas (record producer)
Arista Records EPs